Church of St Peter is a  Grade I listed church in Sharnbrook, Bedfordshire, England. It became a listed building on 13 July 1964. The parish church is dedicated to Saint Peter.  It is of Gothic architecture style, with a tower and spire.  Its interior is decorated with monuments. A hand-tinted aquatint of 'Sharnbrook Church, Bedfordshire' was drawn, engraved and published by Thomas Fisher on November 4, 1812.

See also
Grade I listed buildings in Bedfordshire

References
 This article includes text incorporated from Isaac Slater's "Slater's, late Pigot & co., royal national and commercial directory and topography of the counties of Bedfordshire, Berkshire." (1852), a publication now in the public domain.

External links
 Official website

Church of England church buildings in Bedfordshire
Grade I listed churches in Bedfordshire
Peter